LeeTran is the transit bus service operated by the Lee County Transit Department, providing service to Bonita Springs, Cape Coral, Fort Myers, Fort Myers Beach and much of the unincorporated area of Lee County, Florida. Buses operate Monday through Saturday between 5:00 a.m. and 9:45 p.m., depending on the route; and at various times on Sunday. Trolleys operate Monday through Sunday between 6:30 a.m. and 9:25 p.m..

Routes 
LeeTran serves the following bus routes.

$ Mon-Sat 140 runs Merchants Crossing to Bell Tower, 240 Runs Bell Tower To Coconut Point. On Sundays, 140 runs full route 
& Interlined Routes On Monday to Saturday, On Sunday 600 Runs Regular Route No 240 ȃ Service

Seasonal Routes

Former Routes

References

External links 
 

Bus transportation in Florida
Transportation in Fort Myers, Florida
Bonita Springs, Florida